Relations between Afghanistan and Iran were established in 1935 during King Zahir Shah's reign and the Shah of Iran Reza Shah Pahlavi, though ties between the two countries have existed for millennia. As a result, many Afghans speak Persian, as Dari (an eastern dialect of Persian) is one of the official languages of Afghanistan, and many in Afghanistan also celebrate Nowruz, the Persian New Year.

Relations were negatively affected by the 1979 Iranian Revolution and issues related to the 1978–present Afghan conflicts (i.e. Mujahideen, Afghan refugees, and the Taliban), as well as Iran's water dispute and the growing influence of the United States in the Islamic Republic of Afghanistan. In July 2019, the Iranian government passed a law that provides Afghan nationals with a new chance to get Iranian residency. Afghans with specific scientific and professional achievements and those who have Iranian spouses and children are among those who are qualified to benefit from the law.

Historical context 
Afghanistan shares a relatively long history with Iran (called Persia in the West before 1935) and it was part of many Persian Empires such as Achaemenid and Sasanian dynasties. In fact the regions which encompass the modern state of Afghanistan were considered an integral part of Iran (Persia) by the 11th century poet Firdawsi in his Shahnameh, Zabulistan was even considered the homeland of the Iranian hero Rostam. When the Safavid dynasty was founded in Persia, part of what is now Afghanistan was ruled by the Khanate of Bukhara and Babur from Kabulistan. The first Iranian Safavid Shah Shah Ismail I quickly expanded his empire in all directions, in which he also conquered large parts of nowadays Afghanistan. For centuries they ruled the region and the Safavids didn't have any problems at first ruling the easternmost territories of their empire, but their policy towards non-Shia subjects became worse and worse over time. Wars began between the Shia Safavids and the larger Sunnis, particularly in the Old Kandahar region. By the late 17th century, the Safavids were heavily declining. They had appointed their Georgian subject Gurgin Khan as governor of Kandahar in order to forcefully convert the Afghans from Sunni Islam to Shia Islam, resulting in widespread oppression and violence.

It remained this way until the rise of Mirwais Hotak, a well-respected Sunni Ghilzai Pashtun tribal chief. Mirwais succeeded in defeating the declining Safavids in a succession of battles and declared southern Afghanistan a completely independent country. His son Mahmud conquered Persia for a short time in 1722, while it was ridden by civil strife and foreign interests from the Safavids' archrivals, the Ottomans and the Russians, and soon afterward, the Safavid dynasty ended.

Despite those events, there are cultural ties between the two nations extending thousands of years. As a result, an eastern dialect of Persian, Dari is one of the official dialects of Afghanistan. Many in Afghanistan celebrate Nowruz, a pre-Islamic Iranian spring celebration celebrated in many countries and regions in the world, the main representative being Balkh a province in the north of Afghanistan.

Contemporary era 

Afghanistan signed a treaty of friendship with Iran in 1921, when the country was ruled by King Amanullah Khan and Iran was still under the Qajar dynasty. In September 1961 ties between two countries were broken off and resumed in May 1963. Prior to 1979, the year in which Iran underwent the Iranian Revolution and Afghanistan was invaded by the Soviet Union, the issue of water rights of the Helmand River were an issue of great importance between the two nations. Disputes over the Helmand water occurred in the 1870s, flaring again after the river changed course in 1896. In 1939, the kings of the two countries signed an accord to share water rights, which was signed but never ratified. That was repeated in 1973 with a treaty between the prime ministers of both nations and again not ratified. According to a Reuters report, In 2018 Afghan forces accused Iran of presenting the Taliban with arms and money, but Iran denies the accusation.

According to the Daily Pioneer, because of the ongoing agreement between Iran and Afghanistan, their relationship has yet to be manipulated by any third party and will remain so in the future. According to Deutsche Welle in 2018, an increase in Taliban activity in the border between Iran and Afghanistan suggests a possible cooperation between the Iranian forces and the Talibans.

Post-1979

In December 1979, the Soviet Union sent around 100,000 troops to the Democratic Republic of Afghanistan to assist the PDPA government against a nationwide mujahideen insurgency. The mujahideen were made up of various groups that were trained by Pakistan, Saudi Arabia, and the United States. A number of revolutionary Shi'a groups took control of parts of Hazarajat in 1979 in opposition to the mujahideen groups, and had ties to the Iranian government. After the death of Khomeini in 1989, the Iranian government encouraged many of the Shi'a groups to combine and establish the Hezb-e Wahdat, hoping that they would be included in international negotiations. Between the Soviet Union's withdrawal in February 1989 and the fall from power of president Najibullah in April 1992, Iran supported the PDPA government. In the words of historian Barnett Rubin, "Iran saw the Soviet-backed Kabul government as the main force blocking the takeover of Afghanistan by Sunni Wahhabi parties backed by these three countries [Pakistan, Saudi Arabia, and the United States]. Although it continued to support Shia parties politically, it did not support their making war on the Najibullah government." In the meantime, over a million Afghan refugees were allowed to enter Iran.

Following the emergence of the Taliban government and their harsh treatment of Afghanistan's minorities, Iran stepped up assistance to the Northern Alliance. Relations with the Taliban deteriorated further in 1998 after Taliban forces seized the Iranian consulate in the northern Afghan city of Mazar-i-Sharif and executed Iranian diplomats.

War in Afghanistan (2001-2021) 

Since late 2001, the Afghan government under Hamid Karzai installed after the has engaged in cordial relations with both Iran and the United States, even as relations between the United States and Iran have grown strained due to American objections to Iran's nuclear program. Iran was an important factor in the overthrow of the Taliban and has since helped revive Afghanistan's economy and infrastructure. It re-opened the Iranian Embassy in Kabul and its associated consulates in other Afghan cities. In the meantime, Iran joined the reconstruction of Afghanistan. Most of its contributions are aimed at developing the Afghan Shi'a communities, especially the ethnic Hazaras and Qizilbash. Iran also has influence on political parties represented by ethnic Tajiks, which includes Abdullah Abdullah's Coalition for Change and Hope and others. On the contrary, many Afghan politicians and experts claim that both Iran and Pakistan are working to weaken Afghanistan.

Besides Afghan lawmakers, leaders in the United States and many NATO officials also believe that Iran is meddling in Afghanistan by playing a double game. Iran usually denies these accusations. For a number of years many senior ISAF officials and others have been accusing Iran of supplying and training the Taliban insurgents.

The government of Iran is strongly against the American military presence in Afghanistan. Iranian officials often criticize specifically the American military in Afghanistan:

Ties between Afghanistan and Iran became further strained in recent years due to Iran's toughened immigration policy, hastening the repatriation of many Afghan asylum seekers. A number of Afghans were executed by hanging in public for crimes punishable with death in Iran (murder, rape, smuggling large amount of drugs, and armed robbery), which sparked angry demonstrations in Afghanistan. Between 2010 and 2011, Afghan and Iranian security forces were involved in border skirmishes in Afghanistan's Nimroz Province. In July 2011, Iran decided to cut off electricity exports to Afghanistan's Nimroz Province. In March 2012, Najibullah Kabuli, leader of the National Participation Front (NPF) of Afghanistan, accused three senior leaders of Iran's Revolutionary Guards of plotting to assassinate him. Some members of the Afghan Parliament accuses Iran of setting up Taliban bases in several Iranian cities, and that "Iran is directly involved in fanning ethnic, linguistic and sectarian tensions in Afghanistan." 

According to Saudi Arabia, Afghan Senate members certified the existence of documents which affirm that the Taliban collected endorsements from both Iran and Russia. Thus members of the Taliban are located in the cities of Mashhad, Yazd and Kerman in Iran. Moreover, the Governor of the state of Farah in Afghanistan, Asif Ning, also confirmed this in an interview with the Dari-speaking Freedom Radio stating: "They are living in the cities of Yazd, Kerman and Mashhad. They eventually return to Afghanistan to vandalize. At the time being, a number of senior members of the Taliban leaders are living in Iran", adding that "[t]he bodies of Taliban fighters killed in recent clashes were delivered to their families in Iran".

Afghanistan has an embassy in Tehran and a consulate in Mashad. In order to prohibit Afghans coming into the country that will bring issues related to the Afghan Civil War with them, as of 2007, Iran charges Afghans over US$100 for a one-month regular visa and a business visa costs them over US$3,000. Before 2007, the visa was issued with only $35 fee.

Fars News Agency reported that Ali Shamkhani, a member of Iran's Supreme National Security Council, had talks with the Afghan Taliban when he was visiting Kabul on 26 December 2018. According to The Washington Post, Iran's military had taken over some of the security operations at the Iran and Afghanistan border in 2018, in anticipation of the US withdrawal. In 2020, the Taliban publicly condemned the U.S. killing of the Iranian Quds Force commander Qassem Soleimani, expressing "deep regret over his martyrdom" and describing Soleimani as a "great warrior".

Second Islamic Emirate Era (2021-present) 
After the Taliban re-capture of Kabul in August 2021, Iran says its embassy in Kabul remains open, but it "strongly" condemned the Taliban's Panjshir Offensive, with Iranian Foreign Ministry spokesman Saeed Khatibzadeh describing it as "by no means acceptable in terms of international law and humanitarian law.” The city of Tehran would even officially name a street "Panjshir Alley" in protest. Mahmoud Ahmadinejad, an influential former Iranian President, even accused the United States of leading a "satanic and anti-human plot" to put the Taliban back in power in order to influence "all regional countries" such as Iran and also accused Afghanistan's neighboring country Pakistan, as well as Russia, and China, being co-conspirators who "trampled on [Afghan] people's lives, basic rights, and their right to self-determination to secure their own interests." Ali Shamkhani, secretary of Iran's Supreme National Security Council (SNSC), publicly insisted on an "inclusive" Taliban government which represents the restrains from "use of military means" and instead of will fulfill obligations of "dialogue to meet the demands of ethnicities and social groups" among the Afghanistan people.

Iranian strategists are dismayed by the prospect of a strong Taliban government in Afghanistan, recalling the hostilities with the First Islamic Emirate during 1996-2001 and its support of American invasion in 2001. The Sunni Islamic model offered by the Taliban is also seen it as a direct threat to Iran's Khomeinist ideological ambitions. Hence, Iran has yet to officially recognize the Islamic Emirate. Since the Taliban victory in Afghanistan, Iran-Afghan relations is marked by deepening border clashes and simmering tensions over mutual differences issues related to water policy, trade and Islamic Emirate's sidelining of pro-Iran elements from political power. In October 2021, Iran reiterated its demand for an "inclusive" government in Afghanistan, as Shia and ethnic minorities were reportedly discriminated against or even killed by Taliban forces. Iranian Foreign Ministry spokesman Saeed Khatibzadeh said on 11 October 2021, Iran was in contact with all parties in Afghanistan, but it was "too early to talk about recognizing any Afghan government".

Since 2021, some sources claimed Iran has provided economic and military assistance to the NRF as a counterweight to the Islamic Emirate. Anti-Taliban commanders of the NRF like Ahmed Massoud and Amrullah Saleh are hosted in Iran. On 1 December 2021, violent clashes erupted between Afghanistan and Iran leading to casualties on both sides. On 3 January 2022, the Iranian government re-iterated its opposition to recognise the Taliban government until it embraced ethnic and demographic diversity. Regular series of border clashes between Iranian Border Guards and Afghan armed forces erupted during numerous intervals in the year 2022. However, Iran has maintained a degree of cooperation with Afghanistan since the Taliban came back to power, and the Taliban were even invited to several celebrations related to the anniversary of Iranian Islamic Revolution.

On 12 April 2022, Iran summoned the Afghan envoy to Tehran on Tuesday, according to Iranian state TV, a day after demonstrators flung rocks at Iranian diplomatic offices in Kabul and Herat over what they dubbed the Islamic Republic's "mistreatment of Afghan refugees." Afterwards Iran has confirmed allowing Taliban diplomats at Afghanistan's Embassy in Tehran, insisting, however, that the decision is not meant to pave the way for official recognition of the Taliban as a de jure government.

In June 2022, a magnitude 5.9 earthquake killed over 1,150 people and caused widespread destruction in southeastern Afghanistan. Iran immediately dispatched two cargo planes carrying first aid supplies to its neighbor after the disaster.

The Taliban's nominee for Chargé d'Affairs was accredited by Iran on February 26, 2023, and the embassy in Tehran was handed over.

Bilateral trade 

Trade between the two nations has increased dramatically since the overthrow of the Taliban government in late 2001. Iran and Afghanistan plan on building a new rail line connecting Mashhad to Herat. In 2009, Iran was one of the largest investor in Afghanistan, which is mainly in the construction of roads and bridges as well as agriculture and health care.

According to the chairman of Afghanistan Chamber of Commerce and Industries, Iran's exports to Afghanistan in 2008 stood at $800 million. IRNA quoted Mohammad Qorban Haqju as saying that Iran imported $4 million worth of products like fresh and dried fruits, minerals, precious stones, and spices from the neighboring country. He said that Iran exported oil products, cement, construction material, carpets, home appliances, and detergents. Iran imported nuts, carpets, agricultural products as well as handicrafts from Afghanistan. Afghanistan imports 90 percent of its needs, except agricultural products.

Afghanistan is a major opium producer. Afghanistan produces 90% of world's heroin. Some of these drugs are smuggled into Iran and from there to European countries. Afghanistan and Iran have been persuaded to cooperate with each other in reciprocal beneficial ways due to worsening economic conditions, according to The Diplomat.

Afghanistan and Iran are major trading partners since they share an extensive border region. As part of the trade corridor with Central Asia, Afghanistan exports to Iran increased to over 40 million USD in 2013 (mostly in form of agricultural products), but then declined to below 20 million USD in 2019. Iranian exports to Afghanistan, mostly in form of petroleum products, steadily increased to over 2.8 billion USD in 2018. In 2021 after the US exit from Afghanistan, the Taliban announced that it would resume fuel imports from Iran. With its trading power and mineral wealth, Iran is seen as a major factor for Afghanistan's economic recovery.

See also

 Afghanistan–Iran border
 Afghans in Iran
 Iran's rights to the Helmand water
 1998 murder of Iranian diplomats in Afghanistan

References

External links
Regional spy networks seen behind attack on Khalid

 
Iran
Bilateral relations of Iran
Relations of colonizer and former colony